S. japonicum may refer to:
 Schistosoma japonicum, an important parasite and one of the major infectious agents of schistosomiasis
 Styphnolobium japonicum, the pagoda tree, Chinese scholar, Japanese pagodatree, a small tree or shrub species native to eastern Asia

See also